Scooby-Doo! Who's Watching Who? is a third-person action-adventure video game developed by Savage Entertainment and Human Soft, Inc. and published by THQ for the PlayStation Portable and Nintendo DS. It is based on the Scooby-Doo franchise, and was released November 17, 2006.

Summary

Scooby and the gang solve mysteries against a competing group of ghost hunters on a reality TV show titled "Ghost Scene Investigators." Gameplay mostly consists of controlling Scooby-Doo in 2D platforming levels. Additional non-platforming scenarios in the game include: controlling Fred in the Mystery Machine, helping Shaggy eliminate obstacles during door-chase sequences, and assisting Velma with investigating clues. Levels within the game include: Haunted Hotel, Sugarland, Abandoned Air Field, Ocean Land, and Wolf's End Lodge.

Reception
Scooby-Doo! Who's Watching Who? received "mixed or average" reviews by critics according to review aggregator Metacritic, with an average rating of 54 out of 100.

References

Action-adventure games
Detective video games
Video games based on Scooby-Doo
2006 video games
PlayStation Portable games
Nintendo DS games
THQ games
Cartoon Network video games
Savage Entertainment games
Single-player video games
Video games developed in the United States